Tom Hahl (born October 6, 1965 in Hämeenlinna) is a Finnish ten-pin bowler who has won bowling titles in 16 different countries worldwide in his international career.

Career 
He made Finnish National Team for the first time at age of 18. In 1987 at the FIQ World Championships he won the individual Bronze medal in the Masters, All-Events and a Silver medal in Trios and Five man teams. In 1990 he won the prestigious AMF World Cup in Pattaya Thailand. In 2002 he participated in the World Games in Akita, Japan, by finishing third. Tom Hahl has bowled 21 career 300 perfect games. Hahl is a member of Finnish bowling Hall of Fame.  Hahl has been living in and representing Singapore since 1994.

Medals in Championships

National Championships 
1983 Finnish Youth Championships Silver

1985 Finnish Youth Championships Gold

1986 Finnish Championships Silver

1987 Finnish Championships Gold in Doubles

1988 Finnish Championships Silver in Teams

1989 Finnish Championships Gold

1990 Finnish Championships Bronze

1990 Finnish Championships Bronze in Teams

1991 Finnish Championships Silver

1991 Finnish Championships Gold in Doubles

1995 Finnish Championships Bronze in Teams

International Championships 
1982 European Youth Championships Silver in Teams

1982 Scandinavian Cup Gold

1983 Nordic Youth Silver in Doubles

1983 Nordic Youth Championships Bronze in Teams

1984 European Youth Championships Silver in Teams

1984 European Youth Championships Silver in Trios

1984 European Team Cup Gold

1984 Nordic Championships Bronze in Trios

1986 European Team Cup Gold

1986 Nordic Championships Silver in Doubles

1986 Nordic Championships Bronze in Trios

1986 Nordic Championships Silver in Teams

1987 World Championships Bronze in All Events

1987 World Championships Bronze in Masters

1987 World Championships Silver in Teams

1987 World Championships Silver in Trios

1990 European Cup Silver

1992 European team Cup Gold

1994 World team Cup Bronze

2001 World Games Bronze

References

1965 births
Living people
Finnish ten-pin bowling players
Finnish expatriates in Singapore
Competitors at the 2001 World Games
World Games bronze medalists
World Games medalists in bowling
People from Hämeenlinna
Sportspeople from Kanta-Häme